Johnny Thomas (23 December 1926 – 5 February 2006) was an English footballer, who played as a winger in the Football League for Swindon Town, Chester and Stockport County.

References

External links

1926 births
2006 deaths
Association football wingers
Swindon Town F.C. players
Chester City F.C. players
Stockport County F.C. players
English Football League players
Everton F.C. players
Footballers from Liverpool
English footballers